End-to-end encryption (E2EE) is a security method that keeps chats and messages secure. The end-to-end encryption is a system of communication where only the users communicating can read the messages. In principle, it prevents potential eavesdroppers – including telecom providers, Internet providers, malicious actors, and even the provider of the communication service – from being able to access the cryptographic keys needed to decrypt the conversation.

End-to-end encryption is intended to prevent  data being read or secretly modified, other than by the true sender and recipient(s). The messages are encrypted by the sender but the third party does not have a means to decrypt them, and stores them encrypted. The recipients retrieve the encrypted data and decrypt it themselves.

Because no third parties can decipher the data being communicated or stored, for example, companies that provide end-to-end encryption are unable to hand over texts of their customers' messages to the authorities.

In 2022, the UK's Information Commissioner's Office, the government body responsible for enforcing online data standards, stated that opposition to E2EE was misinformed and the debate too unbalanced, with too little focus on benefits, since E2EE "helped keep children safe online" and law enforcement access to stored data on servers was "not the only way" to find abusers.

E2EE and privacy 

In many messaging systems, including email and many chat networks, messages pass through intermediaries and are stored by a third party, from which they are retrieved by the recipient. Even if the messages are encrypted, they are only encrypted 'in transit', and are thus accessible by the service provider, regardless of whether server-side disk encryption is used. Server-side disk encryption simply prevents unauthorized users from viewing this information. It does not prevent the company itself from viewing the information, as they have the key and can simply decrypt this data. 

This allows the third party to provide search and other features, or to scan for illegal and unacceptable content, but also means they can be read and misused by anyone who has access to the stored messages on the third-party system, whether this is by design or via a backdoor. This can be seen as a concern in many cases where privacy is very important, such as businesses whose reputation depends on their ability to protect third party data, negotiations and communications that are important enough to have a risk of targeted 'hacking' or surveillance, and where sensitive subjects such as health, and information about minors are involved.

It is important to note that E2EE alone does not guarantee privacy or security. For example, data may be held unencrypted on the user's own device, or be accessible via their own app, if their login is compromised.

Etymology of the term 

The term "end-to-end encryption" originally only meant that the communication is never decrypted during its transport from the sender to the receiver.
For example, around 2003, E2EE has been proposed as an additional layer of encryption for GSM or TETRA, in addition to the existing radio encryption protecting the communication between the mobile device and the network infrastructure. This has been standardized by SFPG for TETRA. Note that in TETRA E2EE, the keys are generated by a Key Management Centre (KMC) or a Key Management Facility (KMF), not by the communicating users.
	  	
Later, around 2014, the meaning of "end-to-end encryption" started to evolve when WhatsApp encrypted a portion of its network, requiring that not only the communication stays encrypted during transport, but also that the provider of the communication service is not able to decrypt the communications either by having access to the private key, or by having the capability to undetectably inject an adversarial public key as part of a man-in-the-middle attack. This new meaning is now the widely accepted one.

Modern usage 
As of 2016, typical server-based communications systems do not include end-to-end encryption. These systems can only guarantee the protection of communications between clients and servers, meaning that users have to trust the third parties who are running the servers with the sensitive content. End-to-end encryption is regarded as safer because it reduces the number of parties who might be able to interfere or break the encryption. In the case of instant messaging, users may use a third-party client or plugin to implement an end-to-end encryption scheme over an otherwise non-E2EE protocol.

Some non-E2EE systems, such as Lavabit and Hushmail, have described themselves as offering "end-to-end" encryption when they did not. Other systems, such as Telegram and Google Allo, have been criticized for not enabling end-to-end encryption by default. Telegram did not enable end-to-end encryption by default on VoIP calls while users were using desktop software version, but that problem was fixed quickly. However, as of 2020, Telegram still features no end-to-end encryption by default, no end-to-end encryption for group chats, and no end-to-end encryption for its desktop clients.

Some encrypted backup and file sharing services provide client-side encryption. The encryption they offer is here not referred to as end-to-end encryption, because the services are not meant for sharing messages between users. However, the term "end-to-end encryption" is sometimes incorrectly used to describe client-side encryption.

Challenges

Man-in-the-middle attacks 
End-to-end encryption ensures that data is transferred securely between endpoints. But, rather than try to break the encryption, an eavesdropper may impersonate a message recipient (during key exchange or by substituting their public key for the recipient's), so that messages are encrypted with a key known to the attacker. After decrypting the message, the snoop can then encrypt it with a key that they share with the actual recipient, or their public key in case of asymmetric systems, and send the message on again to avoid detection. This is known as a man-in-the-middle attack (MITM).

Authentication 

Most end-to-end encryption protocols include some form of endpoint authentication specifically to prevent MITM attacks. For example, one could rely on certification authorities or a web of trust. An alternative technique is to generate cryptographic hashes (fingerprints) based on the communicating users’ public keys or shared secret keys. The parties compare their fingerprints using an outside (out-of-band) communication channel that guarantees integrity and authenticity of communication (but not necessarily secrecy), before starting their conversation. If the fingerprints match, there is in theory, no man in the middle. 

When displayed for human inspection, fingerprints usually use some form of Binary-to-text encoding. These strings are then formatted into groups of characters for readability. Some clients instead display a natural language representation of the fingerprint. As the approach consists of a one-to-one mapping between fingerprint blocks and words, there is no loss in entropy. The protocol may choose to display words in the user's native (system) language. This can, however, make cross-language comparisons prone to errors. 

In order to improve localization, some protocols have chosen to display fingerprints as base 10 strings instead of more error prone hexadecimal or natural language strings. An example of the base 10 fingerprint (called safety number in Signal and security code in WhatsApp) would be:

  37345  35585  86758  07668
  05805  48714  98975  19432
  47272  72741  60915  64451

Other applications such as Telegram, instead, encode fingerprints using emojis.

Modern messaging applications can also display fingerprints as QR codes that users can scan off each other's devices.

Endpoint security 
The end-to-end encryption paradigm does not directly address risks at the communications endpoints themselves. Each user's computer can still be hacked to steal his or her cryptographic key (to create a MITM attack) or simply read the recipients’ decrypted messages both in real time and from log files. Even the most perfectly encrypted communication pipe is only as secure as the mailbox on the other end. Major attempts to increase endpoint security have been to isolate key generation, storage and cryptographic operations to a smart card such as Google's Project Vault. However, since plaintext input and output are still visible to the host system, malware can monitor conversations in real time. A more robust approach is to isolate all sensitive data to a fully air gapped computer. PGP has been recommended by experts for this purpose. However, as Bruce Schneier points out, Stuxnet developed by US and Israel successfully jumped air gap and reached Natanz nuclear plant's network in Iran. To deal with key exfiltration with malware, one approach is to split the Trusted Computing Base behind two unidirectionally connected computers that prevent either insertion of malware, or exfiltration of sensitive data with inserted malware.

Backdoors 
A backdoor is usually a secret method of bypassing normal authentication or encryption in a computer system, a product, or an embedded device, etc. Companies may also willingly or unwillingly introduce backdoors to their software that help subvert key negotiation or bypass encryption altogether. In 2013, information leaked by Edward Snowden showed that Skype had a backdoor which allowed Microsoft to hand over their users' messages to the NSA despite the fact that those messages were officially end-to-end encrypted.

Following terrorist attacks in San Bernardino in 2015 and Pensacola in 2019, the FBI requested backdoors to Apple's iPhone software. The company, however, refused to create a backdoor for the government, citing concern that such a tool could pose risk for its consumers’ privacy.

Compliance and regulatory requirements for content inspection 
While E2EE can offer privacy benefits that make it desirable in consumer-grade services, many businesses have to balance these benefits with their regulatory requirements. For example, many organizations are subject to mandates that require them to be able to decrypt any communication between their employees or between their employees and third parties.
This might be needed for archival purposes, for inspection by Data Loss Prevention (DLP) systems, for litigation-related eDiscovery or for detection of malware and other threats in the data streams. For this reason, some enterprise-focused communications and information protection systems might implement encryption in a way that ensures all transmissions are encrypted with the encryption being terminated at their internal systems (on-premises or cloud-based) so can have access to the information for inspection and processing.

See also 
 Comparison of instant messaging protocols
  – a table overview of VoIP clients that offer end-to-end encryption
 Diffie–Hellman key exchange
 End-to-end auditable voting systems
 Point-to-point encryption

References

Further reading 
 

Cryptography
Telecommunications
Secure communication
Internet privacy